Yi Munjae (born 1959) is a South Korean poet and professor. He is described as a poet who expresses "environmental imagination" in his literature. He is a creative writing professor at Kyung Hee University.

Life 
Yi Munjae is a South Korean poet and professor. He is described as a poet who expresses "environmental imagination" in his literature. He was born in Gimpo, Gyeonggi-do (currently Seo-gu, Incheon), and graduated from Kyung Hee University in Korean Literature. He began his literary career in 1982 while still a university student by publishing  ( Our Old Home's Roof) on the 4th issue of Siundong. He has published poetry collections, ( When I Take Off My Wet Shoe and Show It to the Sun),  ( The Backwoods of the Mind), and essay collections  ( Busy is Lazy),  ( The Poems and Poets I’ve Met). Previously he worked as an adjunct professor in creative writing at Chugye University for the Arts, and as a news director at Sisa journal. Currently he is the executive editor at Munhakdongne, and editor at the Green Review. He has been awarded the Kimdaljin Literature Prize, the Nojak Literature Prize, the Poetry and Poetics Award, and the Sowol Poetry Award.

Writing 
Yi Munjae is a poet who drew an image of young souls adrift in the real world, with flexible poetic imagination. Early in his career, his poetry described the life of a youth who experiences discord with the world, and aimlessly drifts. His early works reflect the poet's own experiences. In his childhood he moved often, did not have a comfortable life, and was raised under a strict father. Only through daydreaming he could escape such realities. Yi Munjae's early poetry collections heavily reflect such childhood experiences. In his early works, "the road" is an important image. It gives a glimpse of the poet's own experiences of having had to move often, and ultimately it reflects the poet's desire to imagine an "uncharted road" and newly wander. At the time, Yi Munjae was known as a poet that represents the minds of the young generation that were worried and uncertain of their future, and desired to wander.

Meanwhile, after  ( The Backwoods of the Mind), his poetry has been praised as expressing environmental imagination.  deals with agriculture, and criticizes the anthropocentricism that has ruined human history. In  ( Imperial Hotel), he states that today's world is a "Jeguk" (empire). To resist through literature against such dystopia, he dug into his memories for things that awakened his emotions.

As such, his subject matter has changed little by little, but Yi Munjae's poetry has always had colorful imagery and unique poetic language. To him, they were tools that could newly lift up emotions in a materialistic world where things of mental and emotional nature are dying out. To sum up, he is a poet that has been healing the wounds of a dystopian world through metaphor.

Works 
  ( When I Take Off My Wet Shoe and Show It to the Sun) 
  ( The Backwoods of the Mind) 
  ( The Spring Going to the Ocean), Munhak21, 1999.
  ( From Mirinae Hill), Pulipmunhak, 2003. 
  ( Imperial Hotel), Munhakdongne, 2004. 
  ( Where Starlight Pours In), Pulipmunhak, 2005. 
  ( Here Right Now is the Very Front), Munhakdongne, 2014.

Awards 
 1995 5th Kimdaljin Literature Prize
 1999 4th Poetry and Poetics Award for Young Poets, 
 2002 17th Sowol Poetry Prize
 2005 5th Ji Hoon Literature Award
 2007 7th Nojak Literature Prize

Further reading 
 Ha Jae-bong, “Remembering Lee Moon-jae”, Lyric Poetry and Poetics, 1995 
 Hwang Hyeon, “A Land of Loss, Finding Life’s Truth”, Literary Criticism Today, 1999

References

External links 
 The Encyclopedia of Contemporary Korean Literature

1959 births
Living people
Academic staff of Kyung Hee University
South Korean male poets
21st-century South Korean poets
21st-century male writers